Protestantism in Brazil began in the 19th century, and grew in the 20th century. The 2010 Census reported that 22.2% of the Brazilian population is Protestant, while in 2020 the percentage was estimated to have risen to 31% of the population, meaning over 65 million individuals, making it the second largest Protestant population in the Western world.

Brazilian Protestantism is primarily represented by Evangelical and Pentecostal churches, and a smaller proportion of Baptists. The remainder is made up of Lutherans, Adventists, Presbyterians and other mainline Protestant traditions.

Since 2010, the number of Catholics in Brazil has dropped by an average of 1.2% per year, on the other hand, the number of Evangelicals has grown by 0.8% per year.

History

Origins
Protestantism was first practiced by Huguenot travelers in attempts to colonize the country while it was under the Portuguese colonial rule. These attempts, however, would not persist. 

A French mission sent by John Calvin was established in 1557, in one of the islands of Guanabara Bay, where the France Antarctique was founded. On March 10 of the same year, these Calvinists held the first Protestant service in Brazil and, according to some accounts, the first in all the New World.

Protestant religions were often introduced by immigrants from Europe but over the last three decades, the number of Neo Pentecostal churches such as the Universal Church of the Kingdom of God have grown significantly.

1820s to 1945
In the 19th century, while the vast majority of Brazilians were nominal Catholics, the nation was underserved by priests, and for large numbers their religion was only nominal. Protestantism in Brazil largely originated with European immigrants as well as British American missionaries following up on efforts that began in the 1820s.

The first Anglican chapel began to offer services to English-speaking people in Rio de Janeiro in 1822. Also in that city, the Prussian consul sponsored the founding of a German and French Reformed congregation in 1827, which today is a Lutheran church.

Among missionaries, Methodists were most active, along with Presbyterians and Baptists. The Seventh-day Adventists began in 1894, and the YMCA was organized in 1896. The missionaries promoted schools colleges and seminaries, including the liberal arts Mackenzie Presbyterian University in São Paulo, and an agricultural school. The Presbyterian schools in particular later became the nucleus of the governmental system. In 1887 Protestants in Rio de Janeiro formed a hospital. 

The missionaries largely reached a working-class audience, as the Brazilian upper-class was wedded either to Catholicism or to secularism. By 1914, Protestant churches founded by U.S. missionaries had 47,000 communicants, served by 282 missionaries. In general, these missionaries were more successful than they had been in Mexico, Argentina or elsewhere in Latin America.

The first Baptists appeared in Brazil who confessed to the observance and rest of the seventh day of the week (Sabbath). They expanded in territory and became one of the countries with the most Seventh Day Baptists in the world.

The Catholic Church was disestablished in 1890, and responded by increasing the number of dioceses and the efficiency of its clergy. Many Protestants came from a large German immigrant community and they were mostly Lutheran, but they were seldom engaged in proselytizing and grew by natural increase. Most Protestants came from missionary activities sponsored from United States and Europe. There were 700,000 Protestants by 1930, and increasingly they were in charge of their own affairs. 

In 1930, the Methodist Church of Brazil became independent of the missionary societies and elected its own bishop. Protestants were largely from a working-class, but their networks help speed their upward social mobility.

Since 1945 
Protestantism, which has resisted syncretism more than other Christian churches have in the diverse country, established a significant presence in Brazil during the first half of the 20th century and grew during the second half. Protestants accounted for fewer than 5% of the population until the 1960s, but by 2000 made up over 15% of those affiliated with a church. Pentecostals and charismatic groups account for most of this expansion. 

With their emphasis on personal salvation and moral codes as well as less ideological approach to politics, these groups have developed broad appeal, particularly among the booming urban migrant communities. The political consequences of this shift are still poorly understood, as the fragmentation of the Protestant community after the late 1970s has weakened it as a vehicle for direct political action.

After centuries of persecution under the Portuguese colonial rule, which was successful in consolidating Catholicism in the country, Protestant denominations saw a rapid growth in their number of followers since the last decades of the 20th century.

According to the 2000 Census, 15.4% of the Brazilian population was Protestant. A recent research conducted by the Datafolha institute shows that 31% of Brazilians are Protestants. The 2010 Census found that 22.2% were Protestant.

Until the late 1970s, the majority of Brazilian Protestants belonged to one of the traditional churches: Lutherans, Presbyterians and Baptists mainly, but the Pentecostals, especially from neo-charismatic churches linked to the prosperity doctrine, have increased largely since then. 

There is also Seventh-day Adventist educational system with over 475 elementary schools, 67 secondary schools, two colleges and a university. The rich and the poor remained traditional Catholics, while most Evangelical Protestants were in the new lower-middle class, known as the "C class" (in a A–E classification system).

Politics

In the Brazilian National Congress, there is Evangelical Caucus, a loosely organized group of Protestant, Evangelical, and Pentecostal lawmakers in the Brazilian government and legislature. If considered a political party, the Evangelical Caucus would be the third largest in the Brazilian government, surpassed only by the Brazilian Democratic Movement and the Workers' Party.

It is reported that 70% of evangelical Protestants voted for President Jair Bolsonaro in 2018 Brazilian general election.

Demography

According to 2010 IBGE Census, the following are the biggest Protestant denominations in Brazil. Only those with more than half a million members are listed.

 Pentecostals: 25,370,484
 Assemblies of God (Assembléias de Deus): 12,314,410 (6.5%) (Classic Swedish-Brazilian Pentecostal denomination.)
 General Convention of the Assemblies of God (Affiliated with the US Assemblies of God, Springfield, MO): 3.6 million.
 National Convention of the Assemblies of God (A.k.a. Madureira Ministry of the Assemblies of God): 2.5 million.
 Other independent Assemblies of God, such as Bethesda Assemblies of God: 1.9 million
 Christian Congregation of Brazil (Italian-Brazilian Pentecostals): 2,289,634 (1.3%)
 O Brasil para Cristo(Brazil for Christ): 2,196,665
 Foursquare Gospel Church Igreja do  Evangelho Quadrangular (Classic Pentecostals in US, but second-wave Pentecostals in Brazil): 1,808,389 (0.8%)
 Baptists: 3,723,691 (1.9%)
 Brazilian Baptist Convention (Affiliated to US Southern Baptists and BWA body member): 1.4 million adherents
 National Baptist Convention (Charismatics Baptists and BWA body member): 1 million.
 Independent Baptist Convention (Scandinavian Baptists): 400,000.
 Brazilian Seventh Day Baptist Conference: 4,953
 Other Baptists: 300,000
 Adventists: 1.8 million (1.0%)
 Seventh-day Adventist Church: 1.6 million
 Promise Adventist Church (Brazilian Pentecostal Adventists): 150,000
 Seventh Day Adventist Reform Movement: 50,000
 Other Adventists: 100,000
 Lutherans: 1 million (0.6%)
 Evangelical Church of the Lutheran Confession in Brazil
 Evangelical Lutheran Church of Brazil
 Other Lutherans
 Reformed churches: 2.5 million
 Presbyterian Church of Brazil: 1,011,300
 Independent Presbyterian Church of Brazil: 85,000
 Renewed Presbyterian Church in Brazil: 131,000 www.iprb.org.br
 Conservative Presbyterian Church in Brazil: 6,000 www.ipcb.org.br
 Fundamentalist Presbyterian Church in Brazil: 1,800
 United Presbyterian Church of Brazil: 3,466
 Evangelical Reformed Church in Brazil: 2,500
 Reformed Churches in Brazil
 Hungarian Reformed Church
 Protestant Church of Brazil
 Swiss Evangelical Church
 Arab Evangelical Church
 Evangelical Congregational Church in Brazil: 50,000
 United Congregational Churches in Brazil: 50,000
 Reformed Anglican Church in Brazil www.igrejaanglicana.com.br
 Comunhao Reformada Battista no Brasil - reformed baptists in Brazil
 Methodists: 340,963 (0.201%)
 Methodist Church of Brazil (Affiliated to US United Methodist Church): 200,000
 Wesleyan Methodist Church (Brazilian Pentecostal Methodists): 100,000
 Other Methodists: 40,000

See also

Evangelicalism in Brazil

References

Further reading
Birman, Patrícia, and Márcia Pereira Leite. "Whatever Happened to What Used to Be the Largest Catholic Country in the World?," Daedalus (2000) 129#2 pp. 271–290 in JSTOR
 Burdick, John. " Why is the Black Evangelical Movement Growing in Brazil?" Journal of Latin American Studies (2005) 37#2 pp 311–332.
 Chesnut, R. Andrew. "The Salvation Army or the Army's Salvation?: Pentecostal Politics in Amazonian Brazil, 1962-1992," Luso-Brazilian Review (1999) 36#2 pp 33–49
 Chesnut, R. Andrew. Born Again in Brazil: The Pentecostal Boom and the Pathogens of Poverty (1997)  excerpt and text search
 Corten, Andre. Pentecostalism in Brazil: Emotion of the Poor and Theological Romanticism (1999) excertp and text search
 Freston, Paul. "Neo-Pentecostalism" in Brazil: Problems of Definition and the Struggle for Hegemony," Archives de sciences sociales des religions (1999) 44#105 pp. 145-162 in JSTOR
 Londono, Diana. "Evangelicals in Brazil," Hemispheric Affairs Dec. 5, 2012
 Willems, Emilio. "Protestantism as a Factor of Culture Change in Brazil," Economic Development and Cultural Change (1955) 3#4 pp. 321–333 in JSTOR

External links

Pope Visits Brazil, Church Loses Ground – ABC News
Catholic Church Losing Followers in Droves – Inter Press Service
Rising Protestant tide sweeps Catholic Brazil – Reuters
Protestants making inroads in Brazil, world's most populous Catholic country – WWRN
Census reveals more Protestants in Brazil – latinamericanstudies.org
Brazilians embrace Protestant faiths – BBC News
Pope heads to Brazil where church losing ground – USA Today
Pragmatic Protestants Winning Converts in Brazil – The New York Times

 
Demographics of Brazil